Cristian Martínez Borja (born 1 January 1988) is a Colombian footballer playing for C.D. Universidad Católica del Ecuador.

Career
Born in Quibdó, Colombia, he made his senior debut with Patriotas playing in the 2006 Categoría Primera B season, before he moved to Brazilian club Internacional in 2007. In January 2008 he joined Mogi Mirim. He scored one goal for Mogi Mirim in 2008 Campeonato Paulista Série A2. Then he played in Guaratinguetá, where he scored one goal in Campeonato Brasileiro Série C. In 2009, he joined Caxias do Sul and later in 2010 he was loaned to Flamengo.

He came to Serbia in December 2010 and signed a loan deal with Red Star Belgrade after being recommended to the club by their former player Dejan Petković. Using Serbian transliteration his name is written as Kristijan Borha (Кристијан Борха) .

On 11 April 2012 he scored a goal in the derby against Partizan after coming on from the bench. This was Borja's first goal in a derby, meanwhile Red Star went through after winning both Cup matches 2–0 and 0–2.

On 18 June 2012, he stopped playing for Red Star and went back to Caxias do Sul. On 3 August he signed a one-year contract with Colombian side Santa Fe.

On 15 August 2013, he joined Mexican side Tiburones Rojos de Veracruz playing in the Liga MX.

Honours
 Red Star
Serbian Cup: 2011–12

 Santa Fe
Superliga Colombiana: 2013

 Veracruz
Copa MX: Clausura 2016

 América de Cali
Categoría Primera B: 2016

LDU Quito
Ecuadorian Serie A: 2018
Copa Ecuador: 2019
Supercopa Ecuador: 2020, 2021

References

External links
 
Cristian Borja Stats at Utakmica.rs 

1988 births
Living people
People from Quibdó
Association football forwards
Colombian footballers
Categoría Primera A players
Categoría Primera B players
Campeonato Brasileiro Série A players
Liga MX players
Serbian SuperLiga players
Ecuadorian Serie A players
Patriotas Boyacá footballers
Sport Club Internacional players
Mogi Mirim Esporte Clube players
Guaratinguetá Futebol players
Sociedade Esportiva e Recreativa Caxias do Sul players
CR Flamengo footballers
Red Star Belgrade footballers
Independiente Santa Fe footballers
C.D. Veracruz footballers
América de Cali footballers
L.D.U. Quito footballers
Colombian expatriate footballers
Expatriate footballers in Brazil
Expatriate footballers in Serbia
Expatriate footballers in Mexico
Expatriate footballers in Ecuador
Sportspeople from Chocó Department